Ada Sophia Dennison McKinley (June 26, 1868 – August 25, 1952) was an American educator and settlement house worker in Chicago, Illinois.  She was the founder of the South Side Settlement House, later renamed in her honor as Ada S. McKinley Community Services, which continues today as a major Chicago social service organization.

Early life and education

Ada Sophia Dennison McKinley was born and raised in Texas during Reconstruction: born in Galveston in 1868, she subsequently moved with her family to Corpus Christi.  She attended Prairie View College and Tillotson Missionary College, and subsequently became a teacher in Texas schools. In 1887, she married the dentist William McKinley, and they subsequently moved north to Chicago.

In Chicago, McKinley became prominent in political and social circles as part of the women's club movement, and was a leading member of the Phyllis Wheatley Club.

In 1916, she served as secretary of the Colored Women's Hughes Republican headquarters in Chicago, which backed the unsuccessful presidential campaign of Charles Evans Hughes.  She worked with other leading African-American women of Chicago on the campaign, including Ella Berry and Ida B. Wells-Barnett.

In the ensuing years of World War I, McKinley served as head recreational host at the "War Camp Club," organized by the Chicago Urban League, which provided social services to returning soldiers and sailors.  The War Camp Club is recognized today as a community-based antecedent to recreational therapy for troops returning from combat.

South Side Settlement

McKinley established the "Soldiers and Sailors Club" in 1919 to attend to the needs of returning African-American servicemen from World War I.  After the Chicago race riot of 1919, she marched together with white settlement house workers including Jane Addams and Harriet Vittum to show that interracial solidarity was possible.

In 1926, McKinley renamed her organization the South Side Settlement House, becoming its president and chief resident.  In the 1940s, the growing organization moved to the community center of the Ida B. Wells Homes.  The South Side Settlement under McKinley's leadership was distinguished from other settlement houses by its work with Wells Homes residents.

Death and legacy

In 1949, the South Side Settlement was renamed the Ada S. McKinley Community House.  McKinley laid the cornerstone at the organization's new headquarters on 34th Street in Bronzeville in 1952.  She died just hours later, of a cerebral hemorrhage.

In the 1990s, it was discovered that McKinley's gravestone in Glenwood, Illinois was in severe disrepair.  Ada S. McKinley Community Services arranged to have her reinterred at the Oak Woods Cemetery in Chicago, along with her husband and son. Her monument stands next to a monument to Chicago mayor Harold Washington.  The dedication of McKinley's monument was marked by an overflight by the Tuskegee Airmen.

As of 2020, Ada S. McKinley Community Services, Inc. operated more than 70 program locations throughout the Chicago metropolitan area and sites in Wisconsin and Indiana, with annual revenue of more than $39 million per year. The agency is currently run by CEO Jamal Malone.

McKinley is also the namesake of the Ada S. McKinley Senior Apartments operated by the Chicago Housing Authority in Chicago's Woodlawn neighborhood.

Works cited

References

American social workers
African-American educators
1868 births
1952 deaths
People from Galveston, Texas
People from Chicago
Clubwomen
American educators
20th-century African-American people